With the establishment of Survey of India by the East India Company in 1767, commenced the first modern scientific survey in India. This is the list of surveys conducted in India.

Government organisations

Other surveys

See also 
 National Archives of India
 India Meteorological Department
 India Post
 Indian Railways
 Reserve Bank of India

References 

Surveying of India
Lists of government agencies in India